Robin Haase and Aisam-ul-Haq Qureshi were the defending champions but chose not to participate.

Oliver Marach and Philipp Oswald won the title, defeating Guillermo Durán and Máximo González 6–1, 4–6, [10–7] in the final.

Seeds

Draw

References
 Main Draw

Open du Pays d'Aix - Doubles
Open du Pays d'Aix